Lunpo Gangri, also known as Loinbo Kangri, is a Himalayan mountain in Tibet Autonomous Region, China.

See also
 List of mountains by elevation
 List of Ultras of Tibet and East Asia
 List of mountains in China

References

External links
 "Lunpo Gangri" on Mountain-forecast.com

Mountains of Tibet
Seven-thousanders of the Himalayas